Edmund Owen Fearnley-Whittingstall (1907-1971) was an English portrait painter.  His works include portraits of John William Charles Wand, Bishop of Bath and Wells (hanging in the Bishop's Palace); Alice Mildred Cable, missionary, (in Cambridge University Library); Air Chief Marshal Sir Christopher Courtney (in the RAF Museum); and William Shepherd Morrison, a former speaker of the House of Commons, in the Palace of Westminster.

He was married in 1929 to tennis player Eileen Bennett Whittingstall and divorced in 1936.

References

1907 births
1971 deaths
20th-century English painters
English male painters
20th-century English male artists